Nebulosa huacamayensis  is a moth of the family Notodontidae first described by James S. Miller in 2008. It is found in cloud-forest habitats in Ecuador.

The length of the forewings is 12–14 mm for males and about 13 mm for females. The ground color of the forewings is brown to gray brown.

The larvae feed on Casearia species.

Etymology
The species name celebrates the Cordillera Huacamayos in eastern Ecuador. Huacamayos
is the Quechua word for the military macaw, Ara militaris, now extinct in that
region.

References

Moths described in 2008
Notodontidae of South America